José Luis Saldívar (died 20 August 2014) was a Mexican professional football player and coach.

Career
Saldívar played for Monterrey, Tampico Madero and Atlético Potosino.

As a coach, he managed León, Irapuato, Cruz Azul and Tecos.

Death
He died of a heart attack at his home in León.

References

1950s births
2014 deaths
Mexican footballers
Mexican football managers
C.F. Monterrey players
Atlético Potosino footballers
Club León managers
Irapuato F.C. managers
Cruz Azul managers
Tecos F.C. managers
Association footballers not categorized by position